Rear Admiral Peter Hogarth Doyle,  (27 September 1925 – 2 May 2007) was a senior commander of the Royal Australian Navy, who served as Deputy Chief of Naval Staff from 1981 to 1982. Doyle served in the Second World War, the Korean War and the Vietnam War in various roles before retiring in 1982. He was mentioned in despatches in the Korean and Vietnam Wars.

References

|-

1925 births
2007 deaths
Australian military personnel of the Korean War
Australian military personnel of the Vietnam War
Royal Australian Navy personnel of World War II
Officers of the Order of Australia
Officers of the Order of the British Empire
People educated at Caulfield Grammar School
People educated at Trinity Grammar School (New South Wales)
Royal Australian Navy admirals